FC Betlemi is a Georgian football club based in the town of Keda. The team currently takes part in Liga 4, the fourth division of Georgian league system.

History
Formed in 1950, Betlemi competed in regional competitions of the Georgian Soviet league. The club showed their best result in the Cup during the first season in 1990 when they reached the 5th round. In the mid-1990s the team was dissolved for more than a decade. 

In the 2011/12 season, Betlemi gained promotion to Pirveli Liga for the first time, where they spent four successive seasons. In April 2015, the whole Georgian football world was shocked to hear about sudden death of team's captain Archil Partenadze during the training session. 

The next season turned out crucial. Despite an encouraging start and reaching the promotion area at the winter break, a wretched run of form later led to Betlemi manager's exit. The team was soon embroiled in a match-fixing scandal and subjected to severe punishment. While a life-long ban on football activity was meted out to five individuals, including four players, Betlemi were expelled from the league. Following this decision and a major purge, the club management as well as eighteen players were replaced. 

Betlemi managed to successfully recover from the crisis and complete the 2016 season on top of the table, but as none of the league winners were promoted this year, the club remained in the third division. In 2019, five bottom teams were involved in a fierce relegation battle up until the last round. Eventually, after one victory in the last eight games, Betlemi hit rock bottom. 

The team was among the top five in the initial three seasons in Liga 4. In 2021 and 2022 they participated in the promotion battle, although in both cases they finished just one place below the qualifying slot.

Seasons

Current squad
As of June 2021

(C)

Manager
Amiran Gogitidze, born in 1964, is known for his successful spell at Matchakhela, Dinamo Batumi and Shukura. He took charge of Betlemi in late 2021.

Honours
• Meore Liga

Winner (1): 2016 (West B)

Stadium
Betlemi's home ground is a 1,000-seat stadium in Keda, named after Archil Partenadze. Some reconstruction works were launched there in August 2020.

Name
Betlemi is a Georgian word for biblical Bethlehem.

References

Football clubs in Georgia (country)